Carol Klimpel (born March 30, 1963) is a female former freestyle swimmer from Canada, who was chosen to represent her native country at the 1980 Summer Olympics in Moscow, but did not participate because of the United States-led Boycott.  She did compete at the 1984 Summer Olympics in Los Angeles, and won a silver medal at the 1979 Pan American Games with the women's relay team.  At the 1978 Commonwealth Games, she won gold medals in the 100-metre freestyle and 4×100-metre freestyle and 4×100-metre medley relays.

References
 Canadian Olympic Committee profile
 4x100 Swimming Pan-American Games 1979 San Juan

1963 births
Living people
Canadian female freestyle swimmers
Commonwealth Games gold medallists for Canada
Olympic swimmers of Canada
Pan American Games silver medalists for Canada
Swimmers from Toronto
Swimmers at the 1978 Commonwealth Games
Swimmers at the 1979 Pan American Games
Swimmers at the 1984 Summer Olympics
Commonwealth Games medallists in swimming
Pan American Games medalists in swimming
Medalists at the 1979 Pan American Games
20th-century Canadian women
21st-century Canadian women
Medallists at the 1978 Commonwealth Games